UFC Fight Night: Manuwa vs. Anderson (also known as UFC Fight Night 107) was a mixed martial arts event produced by the Ultimate Fighting Championship held on March 18, 2017, at The O2 Arena in London, England.

Background
This event was expected to be UFC Fight Night 108, but an initially planned UFN 106 in Las Vegas, Nevada never materialised, prompting the change in numbers.

A light heavyweight bout between Jimi Manuwa and The Ultimate Fighter: Team Edgar vs. Team Penn light heavyweight winner Corey Anderson headlined the event,

Brad Pickett was expected to face Henry Briones, in what would be his retirement bout. However, Briones pulled out a week before the event and was replaced by Marlon Vera. Due to the short notice and preparation for Vera, the bout was contested at a catchweight of 140 lb. After this fight, Pickett placed his gloves on the canvas of the octagon and announced his retirement.

Veronica Macedo was expected to face Lina Länsberg at the event. However, Macedo pulled out of the fight on February 28. She was replaced by promotional newcomer Lucie Pudilová. The fighters first met in 2015, when Länsberg won via unanimous decision at Battle of Botnia 2015 in Sweden.

At the weigh-ins, Ian Entwistle came in at 139 lb, three pounds over the bantamweight limit of 136 lb. As a result, he was fined 20% of his purse, which would go to his opponent Brett Johns and the bout would proceed at a catchweight. However, Entwistle was pulled from the fight on the day of the event and the bout was cancelled.

Moments before the start of the event, Tom Breese was deemed unfit to compete and was pulled from his bout against Oluwale Bamgbose.

Results

Bonus awards
The following fighters were awarded $50,000 bonuses:
Fight of the Night: Not awarded
Performance of the Night:  Jimi Manuwa, Gunnar Nelson, Marlon Vera and Marc Diakiese

See also
List of UFC events
2017 in UFC

References

UFC Fight Night
2017 in mixed martial arts
2017 sports events in London
2017 in English sport
Mixed martial arts in the United Kingdom
Sports competitions in London
March 2017 sports events in the United Kingdom